Scythris tumidella is a moth of the family Scythrididae. It was described by Kari Nupponen and Timo Nupponen in 2001. It is found in Russia (Altai).

References

tumidella
Moths described in 2001
Moths of Asia